Benjamin Hyett II (1708–1762) was the owner of Painswick House, now a grade I listed building, which he inherited from his father the member of Parliament Charles Hyett (died 1738). His father built the house to escape the smog of Gloucester but died soon after it was completed.

Hyett was the brother of Nicholas Hyett (1709–1777), and the grandson of Benjamin Hyett (1651–1711).

Nicholas and Benjamin Hyett stood as Tories in the parliamentary elections of 1734 and 1741. Neither was successful.

It was Benjamin who created what is now known as the Painswick Rococo Garden which was painted by Thomas Robins the Elder in 1748. He also created a Rococo garden on land adjacent to the, by then, mostly ruined Gloucester Castle which was under the control of the Hyett family by virtue of his brother Nicholas's position as keeper and constable of the castle.

References

External links
http://www.bbc.co.uk/news/uk-england-gloucestershire-32914568

Hyett family
1708 births
1762 deaths